Good Morning, Kris is a Philippine morning talk show on ABS-CBN, hosted solely by Kris Aquino. The show served as the replacement of Morning Girls with Kris and Korina, after Korina Sanchez was placed on her magazine show Rated K (replacing Sharon) and it ran for sixteen months. It premiered on May 31, 2004 and ended on October 8, 2004 after a mere 5 months.

Overview

Premiere
Good Morning, Kris premiered on May 31, 2004, after a very successful run of the morning show Morning Girls with Kris and Korina for 16 months. Kris Aquino was the sole host of the show, and it was aired live where its predecessor was before. It dealt with many subjects, whether lovelife or family problems.

Format
Aquino would sit on a sofa lounge chair, and the guest would sit  in front of her or sometimes beside her, so that she can accommodate everyone and can easily talk to them. Although the show is somewhat similar to its predecessors, Aquino aims to give an aura to everyone who is in her show, whether her celebrity guest, the live studio audience, or the people who are watching her every day.

Notable guests
Some guests include Star Circle Quest alumnae Hero Angeles, where he discussed about his relationship with fellow alumnae and now Korean superstar Sandara Park and also include American Idol (season 3) 2nd Runner-up Jasmine Trias, where she sang a song together with Troy Montero.

Cancellation
The show was axed by the management after 5 months on October 8, 2004, due to low ratings against its competitor SIS. ABS-CBN executives decided to replace it with Morning Star which had a concept of talk-reality and was hosted by a number of assigned ABS-CBN talents.

See also
List of programs aired by ABS-CBN

References

ABS-CBN original programming
2004 Philippine television series debuts
2004 Philippine television series endings
Philippine television talk shows
Filipino-language television shows